Djakaria "Djaka" Barro (born 12 January 2002) is an Ivorian professional footballer who plays as a midfielder for Spanish club FC Cartagena B.

Club career
Born in Ivory Coast, Barro moved to Spain and was a CD Leganés youth graduate. He made his senior debut with the C-team on 11 April 2021, playing the last 31 minutes in a 1–1 Primera Categoría de Aficionados away draw against CD Los Yébenes San Bruno B.

On 25 August 2021, Barro was loaned to FC Cartagena and was assigned to the reserves in Tercera División RFEF. In October, however, he suffered a serious knee injury, being sidelined for the remainder of the campaign.

On 21 July 2022, Barro returned to Cartagena and their B-team, signing a three-year contract. He made his first team debut on 13 November, coming on as a late substitute for Isak Jansson in a 1–0 away win over CD Alfaro, for the season's Copa del Rey.

Barro made his professional debut on 3 January 2023, replacing Damián Musto in 5–1 home loss against Villarreal CF, also for the national cup.

References

External links

2002 births
Living people
Ivorian footballers
Association football midfielders
Segunda Federación players
Tercera Federación players
Divisiones Regionales de Fútbol players
FC Cartagena B players
FC Cartagena footballers
Ivorian expatriate footballers
Ivorian expatriate sportspeople in Spain
Expatriate footballers in Spain